Nikolay Sergeevich Goldobin (Николай Сергеевич Голдобин, born 7 October 1995) is a Russian professional ice hockey right winger currently playing for Metallurg Magnitogorsk of the Kontinental Hockey League (KHL). Goldobin was selected by the San Jose Sharks in the first round (27th overall) of the 2014 NHL Entry Draft.

Playing career
Goldobin played in the 2008 Quebec International Pee-Wee Hockey Tournament with the HC CSKA Moscow youth team.

Junior
Goldobin was drafted by the Sarnia Sting in the 1st round (36th overall) of the 2012 OHL Priority Selection. Goldobin was also selected 8th overall by Metallurg Novokuznetsk in the 2012 KHL Junior Draft. Heading into the 2014 NHL Entry Draft, Goldobin was viewed as a top prospect and possible top 15 pick.

Goldobin began his major junior career in 2011 playing with Russkie Vityazi Chekhov in the Russian Junior Hockey League and he was chosen to compete at the 2012 Ivan Hlinka Memorial Tournament with Team Russia. He joined the Sarnia Sting in 2012 where he led all rookies in goals (30) and points (68) during the 2012–13 OHL season. His outstanding play continued during his second season with Sarnia, as he led the Sting with 94 points in 67 games, good enough for 6th in scoring in the league for the 2013–14 OHL season. He was invited to play in the 2014 CHL Top Prospects Game where he scored a goal and an assist, and was named player of the game for Team Cherry.

Professional
On 26 September 2014, the Sharks announced they had signed Goldobin to a three-year entry level contract. He was later reassigned to the Finnish club HIFK for the 2014–15 Liiga season.

In his first full North American season, Goldobin was assigned to begin the 2015–16 season with the Sharks AHL affiliate, the San Jose Barracuda. After one game with the Barracuda, Goldobin received a recall to the Sharks following an injury to center Logan Couture on 16 October 2015. He was inserted immediately into the Sharks top scoring line and made his NHL debut in a 2–1 shootout victory over the New Jersey Devils. In his second game, Goldobin scored his first NHL goal against Jaroslav Halak of the New York Islanders on 17 October 2015, on a feed from Joe Thornton.

On 28 February 2017, he was traded from San Jose along with a conditional 4th round-pick in the 2017 NHL Entry Draft to the Vancouver Canucks for Jannik Hansen. He made his debut for the Canucks on 4 March 2017, scoring the game-winning goal in a 4–3 victory over the Los Angeles Kings.

In the 2018-19 season, his first full season with the Canucks, Goldobin recorded 27 points in 63 games. On 4 September 2019, the Canucks re-signed him to a one-year, $900,000 contract extension. On 30 September 2019, just before the start of the 2019-20 season, Goldobin was placed on waivers by the Canucks. He cleared waivers the next day and was assigned to the Utica Comets. Goldobin remained with the Comets for the majority of the season, finishing among the club's leading scorers with 50 points in 51 games, before the season was cancelled due to COVID-19.

As an impending restricted free agent with the Canucks, Goldobin opted to leave North America by signing a two-year contract with his original Russian club, CSKA Moscow of the KHL, on 18 June 2020. In the 2020–21 season, Goldobin appeared in 21 regular season games with CSKA, collecting 4 goals and 11 points before he was transferred to a fellow KHL club, Metallurg Magnitogorsk, for the remainder of the season on 14 December 2020.

Career statistics

Regular season and playoffs

International

Awards and honours

References

External links
 

1995 births
HC CSKA Moscow players
HIFK (ice hockey) players
Living people
Metallurg Magnitogorsk players
Russian ice hockey left wingers
Ice hockey people from Moscow
National Hockey League first-round draft picks
San Jose Barracuda players
San Jose Sharks draft picks
San Jose Sharks players
Sarnia Sting players
Utica Comets players
Vancouver Canucks players
Worcester Sharks players